Yaoshan or Mount Yao may refer to the following locations in China:

Mount Xiao (崤山), or Mount Yao, range in western Henan
Mount Yao (Lushan County) (尧山), in central Henan
Yaoshan, Hebei (腰山镇), town in Shunping County
Yaoshan, Henan (尧山镇), town in Lushan County
Yaoshan, Liaoning (药山镇), town in Xiuyan Manchu Autonomous County
 Yaoshan, Jinshi (药山镇), a town in Jinshi City, Hunan Province.
Yaoshan, Qiaojia County (药山镇), town in Yunnan
Yaoshan Subdistrict (药山街道), Tianqiao District, Jinan
Yaoshan Township, Guizhou (瑶山乡), in Libo County
Yaoshan Township, Yunnan (瑶山乡), in Hekou Yao Autonomous County
Yaoshan Township, Zhejiang (瑶山乡), in Chun'an County